Myxosarcoma is a rare malignant tumor of the heart.

References

External links 

Sarcoma